"When You Were Young" is a song by American rock band the Killers. It was released on September 18, 2006, as the lead single from their second studio album, Sam's Town (2006). The song was written and produced by The Killers and co-produced by Flood and Alan Moulder.

The song has proven to be one of the Killers' most successful singles, peaking at number 14 on the Billboard Hot 100, as well as their first number one on the U.S. Modern Rock Tracks chart. Only "Mr. Brightside" and "Somebody Told Me" would stay longer on the chart and have more pop airplay. It is also their highest-charting single to date in the United Kingdom and Australia, peaking at number two and number 10 respectively.

Background
The song, which is in the key of B major and written in common time, displays the band's move towards a more "heartland rock" style, as it is part of an album that was supposedly heavily influenced by the music of Bruce Springsteen. The song itself was reportedly influenced by Springsteen's "Born to Run" and "Thunder Road". The song was nominated for the Grammy Award for Best Rock Song, and the single's video, directed by Anthony Mandler, received a nomination in the category of Best Short Form Music Video. The single was ranked number 69 on iTunes Top 100 Best Sellers: Songs of 2006. The song also made number 4 on the Triple J Hottest 100, 2006.

Music video
The music video for this song was filmed in Tlayacapan, Mexico. The visual style was inspired by the films Japón and Batalla en el Cielo directed by Carlos Reygadas.

Anthony Mandler was the video director and portrayed a very specific storyline, intercut with scenes of the band playing in situ. Flowers commented; “My version of what the song is about is different than what Anthony is portraying in the video”. 

In a frame story, it tells the story of a young woman around the age of 20. The video opens with her arriving at a large, white, wooden cross in a rocky hill. She mourns in front of it until a man, who had been desperately searching for her, shows up and comforts her. The following scenes are mostly flashbacks that would illustrate the story of how they came to be there.

The first of these flashbacks is one in which the same woman is praying at a church; after leaving, she encounters the man outside. They kiss and it is evident that there is a romantic relationship between them. One day she arrives home to their shared house to find the man in bed with another woman; seeing them together, she leaves the house, heavily distraught. As the woman runs through the town with tears in her eyes, the video flashes back to their joyous wedding, making it clear that they are husband and wife and that they were thoroughly happy together. The next scene is another flashback in which the man gazes on as she pours water on her legs, demonstrating the attraction he had for her.

Later, the video cuts to a very early scene in the story, set within a bar that the man appears to own. The woman enters and introduces herself for the first time to her future husband, who at the time was chatting to his future mistress. It appears as though she had applied for employment at the bar, because he promptly gives her an apron and leads her away into another room, much to the annoyance of the other woman. In this room the Killers are playing to a small crowd within the bar and in the drums says "Los Dientes Del Perro" as the band name, that in Spanish means "The Dog's Teeth". She shares a prolonged look with Brandon Flowers as he sings the last verse, before turning away to attend to the man's instructions. The final shot of the music video comes back to the first scene set next to wooden cross, with the woman still on the ground and her husband there with her.

The video stars Mexican actors Gustavo Sánchez Parra & Sonia Couoh.

There is also an alternate version of the video in which the woman jumps off a cliff instead of reconciling with the husband.

Awards

Track listings
CD: Island / ISLR16591-2 United States
 "When You Were Young" (radio version) – 3:39
 US promo

7-inch: Vertigo / 170 672-1 United Kingdom
 "When You Were Young" – 3:39
 "Where the White Boys Dance" – 3:26

CD: Vertigo / 170 765-8 United Kingdom
 "When You Were Young" – 3:39
 "All the Pretty Faces" – 4:44

CD: Island / 0 602517 07658 7 Germany
 "When You Were Young" – 3:39
 "All the Pretty Faces" – 4:44
 "When You Were Young" (video)

CD: Island / ISLR 16633-2 United States
 "When You Were Young" (Jacques Lu Cont's Thin White Duke Radio Edit) – 3:58
 "When You Were Young" (The Lindbergh Palace Radio Edit) – 4:31
 "When You Were Young" (Jacques Lu Cont's Thin White Duke Mix) – 6:23
 "When You Were Young" (The Lindbergh Palace Remix) – 6:59
 "When You Were Young" (Jacques Lu Cont's Thin White Duke Dub) – 6:23
 "When You Were Young" (The Lindbergh Palace Dub) – 6:50
 US promo

2x12-inch: Island / B0007884-11 United States
 "When You Were Young" (Jacques Lu Cont's Thin White Duke Mix) – 6:23
 "When You Were Young" (The Lindbergh Palace Remix) – 6:59
 "When You Were Young" (Jacques Lu Cont's Thin White Duke Dub) – 6:23
 "When You Were Young" (The Lindbergh Palace Dub) – 6:50

Charts

Weekly charts

Year-end charts

Certifications

Release history

Covers
Coldplay's Chris Martin covered the song at an unplanned appearance for MENCAP.
Amy Macdonald covered the song in her native Scotland and at Lowlands Fest in 2008.
Biffy Clyro covered the song on live radio on "Today FM".
The Infamous Stringdusters covered the song live for The A.V. Club.
Simon Webbe, a former member of British boy band Blue, covered the song on BBC's Radio 1 in the Live Lounge and on tour.
Taking Back Sunday covered the song at London's Taste of Chaos on November 18, 2006.
Astrid Swan covered the song on KCMP in April 2007.
The Noisettes covered the song on March 25, 2009, on BBC's Radio 1 in the Live Lounge. This cover was included in Radio 1's Live Lounge – Volume 4, the fourth album in a series of Live Lounge albums, released in October of the same year.
Synthpop artist Joy Electric covered the song on his thirteen studio album, Favorites at Play.
 Trio Of Oz included "When You Were Young" on their 2010 self-titled studio album.
Garrison Starr recorded an acoustic version of the song for her 2012 free extended play, Not For Nothing.
SYMT has covered the song at Stage Monks Studios.
Vinyl Theatre covered the song live on tour in 2015.
Against the Current covered the song on their YouTube channel in 2016.
 Patrick Kell covered the song on his 2017 album titled See the Light.
Modern Baseball covered the song during their farewell residency at Philadelphia's Union Transfer in October 2017.
 Indie pop band Echosmith covered the song as part of their setlist during their 2018 Inside A Dream tour.
Midtown (band) covered the song during their 2022 Resurrection tour.

In popular culture
The song appears in the video games, Guitar Hero III: Legends of Rock, SingStar Amped, Rock Band and Guitar Hero Live.
The single's B-side, "All the Pretty Faces" appears in Guitar Hero 5.
The song was featured in the third section of the 2006 Victoria's Secret Fashion Show.
In 2009 it was voted at number 37 in the UK radio station XFM's

References

External links
 "When You Were Young" music video on Vevo

2006 singles
2006 songs
Island Records singles
The Killers songs
Music videos directed by Anthony Mandler
Music videos shot in Mexico
Song recordings produced by Alan Moulder
Song recordings produced by Flood (producer)
Songs written by Brandon Flowers
Songs written by Dave Keuning
Songs written by Mark Stoermer
Songs written by Ronnie Vannucci Jr.
Vertigo Records singles